Public transport in Badalona (Catalonia, Spain) consists of a variety of services operated by several companies, most of them associated with Autoritat del Transport Metropolità, the main transport authority of the Metropolitan Area of Barcelona. At just over 220,000 inhabitants, Badalona is one of Catalonia's most populated towns, and is located immediately next to the capital Barcelona, along the Mediterranean Sea coastline. It is both a dormitory town and a developed city in itself, which makes the proper articulation of transport of vital importance.

Barcelona Metro stations
The branch of L2 serving Badalona was first part of L4. Handover took place in the 1990s, when the construction of L2 took place. The long-announced L10 is currently under construction, but the stations located within the municipality of Badalona, along with some in Barcelona, are already operative as of 2010. An extension of L1 from Fondo, in Santa Coloma de Gramenet, is currently planned.

Rodalies commuter railway station

Tram stations
All served by Trambesòs since 2007.

Bus lines

Operated by TMB
 H10: Plaça de Sants (Barcelona) - Olímpic Badalona (Badalona)

Operated by TUSGSAL
 B1: Av. Martí Pujol (Badalona) - Metro Fondo (Santa Coloma)
 B2: Manresà (Badalona) - "Hospital Esperit Sant" (Santa Coloma)
 B3: Les Guixeres (Badalona) - Llefià (Badalona)
 B4: Mas-Ram (Badalona) - Montigalà (Badalona)
 B5: "Estació Rodalies" (Badalona) - "Hospital Esperit Sant" (Santa Coloma)
 B6: "Estació Rodalies" (Badalona)- "Hospital Can Ruti" (Badalona)
 B7: "Estació Rodalies" (Sant Adrià) - Bonavista/Bufalà (Badalona)
 B8: Bonavista-Bufalà-Bonavista (Badalona) (línia circular)
 B12: Pl. Lluís Companys (Montcada) - "Can Ruti Tanatori" (Badalona)
 B14: "Estació Rodalies" (Sant Adrià) - Can Franquesa (Santa Coloma)
 B15: Les Oliveres (Santa Coloma) - Montigalà (Badalona)
 B19: "Hospital Can Ruti" (Badalona) - "Vall d'Hebron (Barcelona)
 B20: Les Oliveres (Santa Coloma - Ronda de Sant Pere (Barcelona)
 B23: Montigalà (Badalona) - Diagonal Mar(Barcelona)
 B24: "Hospital Can Ruti" (Badalona) - Ronda de Sant Pere (Barcelona)
 B25: Pomar (Badalona) - Ronda de Sant Pere (Barcelona)
 B26 "Hospital Can Ruti" (Badalona) - "Estació Rodalies" (Sant Adrià)
 B27: Les Oliveres (Santa Coloma - "Francesc Layret" (Badalona)
 B28 "Hospital Can Ruti" (Badalona) - "Sant Andreu" (Barcelona)
 B29: Montigalà (Badalona) - "Poliesportiu Tiana" Tiana
 B30: Can Franquesa (Santa Coloma) - La Virreina (Tiana)
 B80: Can Franquesa - Santa Eulàlia (Santa Coloma)
 B81: La Bastida - "Hospital de l'Esperit Sant" (Santa Coloma)

"NitBus" (night bus)
 N2: Av.Carrilet (L'Hospitalet) - Via Augusta (Badalona)
 N9: Portal de la Pau (Barcelona) - Edith Llaurador (Tiana)
 N11: Pl.Catalunya (Barcelona) - Hospital Can Ruti (Badalona)

Port of Badalona
Port of Badalona
Club de Vela Badalona

Transport in the municipalities of Badalonès
Transport in Barcelona
Transport in L'Hospitalet de Llobregat
Transport in Montcada i Reixac
Transport in Sant Adrià de Besòs
Transport in Santa Coloma de Gramenet

Transport in other Metropolitan Area municipalities
Transport in Cornellà de Llobregat

See also
Autoritat del Transport Metropolità

References